Jiří Jesenský (27 September 1905 – 24 October 1942) was a Czech fencer. He competed in the individual (19th place) and team (10th place) foil events at the 1936 Summer Olympics. He was an active member of the resistance movement in Czechoslovakia during World War II. He was executed by firing squad in the Mauthausen concentration camp.

References

External links
 

1905 births
1942 deaths
Czech male fencers
Czechoslovak male fencers
Olympic fencers of Czechoslovakia
Fencers at the 1936 Summer Olympics
People who died in Mauthausen concentration camp
Czech people executed in Nazi concentration camps
People executed by Nazi Germany by firing squad